The Heckscher Museum of Art is named after its benefactor, August Heckscher, who in 1920 donated 185 works of art to be housed in a new Beaux-Arts building located in Heckscher Park, in Huntington, New York. The museum has over 2000 works of art, focused on American landscape paintings and work by Long Island artists, as well as featuring American and European modernism, and photography. The most famous painting in the collection is George Grosz’s “Eclipse of the Sun” (1926).

History
Founded by August Heckscher in 1920, the museum was based on his initial donation of 185 works of art. The building was designed by Julius Franke of the New York architecture firm of Maynicke & Franke.

In 1957 the Town of Huntington passed responsibility for running the museum to an independent board of trustees, after which the museum began once again to expand its collection. The collection was greatly enlarged in 2001 with the donation of a large collection of American paintings and drawings by Ronald G. Pisano and D. Frederick Baker, one of the largest gifts to the museum since August Heckscher's original donation. In 2008, the museum completed a less ambitious nine-month restoration.

Collection

The collection has grown from its original 185 works to over 2,100, and spans over 500 years. The oldest major work is Lucas Cranach the Elder’s Virgin, Child, St. John the Baptist and Angels of 1534.

The museum has works by 17th, 18th and 19th century European painters, but is strongest in 19th and 20th century American artists, including works by painters such as William Merritt Chase, Frederic Church, Asher Durand, Thomas Eakins, Winslow Homer, George Inness, Edward Moran, and Thomas Moran.

The modern and abstract art collections are extensive and includes artists such as Ilya Bolotowsky, Georgia O'Keeffe, Knox Martin, and Esphyr Slobodkina. The museum also features many works from one-time Huntington residents such as Arthur Dove, Helen Torr, and George Grosz.

The photography collection features the work of Berenice Abbott, Larry Fink, Eadweard Muybridge, and Man Ray's Electricité portfolio of 1931.

The museum is normally open year round from Wednesday through Sunday. There is an admission fee.

Notes

External links

 Museum website

Huntington, New York
Art museums and galleries in New York (state)
Museums in Suffolk County, New York
Art museums established in 1920
1920 establishments in New York (state)